The Billy's are an American rock band from the Twin Cities. They recorded 3 studio albums in the mid to late 1990s which were released by the OarFin Records label. Their sound generally falling under the Alternative country label, they were often compared to the Gear Daddies. The band built a sizable following, particularly in the Mid-West. In addition to their own material, live shows were well known for wide ranging covers.

Members

Andy Christensen — bass
Scott Ehrenberg — guitar, vocals
Eric Roberts — vocals, guitar
Rob Thompson — drums

Discography

Roses and Flowers and Plants — 1994
All American Lounge — 1995
Another Winner — 1997
Here Comes The Rock End Roll — 2001

External links
 http://www.myspace.com/rockendroll

Rock music groups from Minnesota
Musical groups from the Twin Cities